Visa requirements for Santomean citizens are administrative entry restrictions by the authorities of other states placed on citizens of São Tomé and Príncipe. As of 2 July 2019, Santomean citizens had visa-free or visa on arrival access to 57 countries and territories, ranking the Santomean passport 86th in terms of travel freedom (tied with passports from Mauritania and India) according to the Henley Passport Index.

Visa requirements map

Visa requirements

Dependent, Disputed, or Restricted territories
Unrecognized or partially recognized countries

Dependent and autonomous territories

See also

Visa policy of São Tomé and Príncipe
Santomean passport

References and Notes
References

Notes

São Tomé and Príncipe
Foreign relations of São Tomé and Príncipe